Deepa Chari is an Indian actress and swimsuit model working in Kollywood.

Background
Chari was born in Mumbai, India. She took to modeling at an early age and became one of the most sought after bikini models in Mumbai.

Career
Chari has myriad modeling assignments to her name, from endorsing brands to being the bikini-clad calendar girl. She has also performed various ramp shows with designers like Manish Malhotra, Vikram Phadnis, Hemanth Trivedi, and Krishna Mehta.

She has appeared in various chart-topping music albums and worked with acclaimed directors and renowned production houses. "Kanta laga" the remix directed by Vinay Sapru and Radhika Rao and "Saiyaan dil mein aana re" with Anubhav Sinha productions are few of her most popular works.

Chari is one of the most accomplished dancers in the current Indian entertainment scene and has also acted in a Hindi film: Kabootar by Anubhav Sinha. The film Kabootar premiered at the 10th Osians-Cinefan Festival of Asian and Arab Cinema and was much appreciated by the audience. She performed the leading role in the 2009 film Balam and has a lead role in an upcoming movie KA-99-B-333.

Career achievements
 Winner, Gladrags Mega Model Contest 2004.
 Won 1st runner up, n ”Best Body".
 Winner, Best Model of the World Contest 2003–2004.
 Won "Best smile of the World" Held in Turkey.
 Winner, Miss tourism of the world 2004–2005.
 Won "Best smile of the year" 04–05. Held in Malaysia

Filmography
This filmography is based on the official website of Deepa Chari.

References

External links
 Deepa Chari's official website

Indian film actresses
Living people
Year of birth missing (living people)
Actresses in Tamil cinema